Birds described in 1897 include  African crimson-winged finch, bare-throated whistler, black sittella, black solitaire, bronze parotia, cream-browed white-eye, dwarf sparrowhawk, MacGregor's honeyeater, Shelley's greenbul, sulphur-breasted warbler, thick-billed heleia,

Events 
Death of  Charles Bendire, Edward Newton, James William Abert

Publications
Frank Chapman Bird-Life: A Guide to the Study of Our Common Birds.
Neltje Blanchan Bird Neighbours
Stolzmann  Oiseaux de la Ferghana d'apres les recherches faites par M. Thomas Barey (1892-1895). Par Jean Stolzmann. Bull. Soc. Imp. de Natural. Moscou, 1897, no. 1, p. 54.] 
Ongoing events
Osbert Salvin and Frederick DuCane Godman 1879–1904. Biologia Centrali-Americana . Aves
Richard Bowdler Sharpe Catalogue of the Birds in the British Museum London,1874-98.
Eugene W. Oates and William Thomas Blanford 1889–1898. The Fauna of British India, Including Ceylon and Burma. Vols. I-IV. Birds.
Anton Reichenow, Jean Cabanis, Hans von Berlepsch, Otto Kleinschmidt and other members of the German Ornithologists' Society in Journal für Ornithologie online BHL
The Ibis
Novitates Zoologicae
Ornithologische Monatsberichte Verlag von R. Friedländer & Sohn, Berlin.1893–1938 online Zobodat
The Auk online BHL

Ornis; internationale Zeitschrift für die gesammte Ornithologie.Vienna 1885-1905online BHL

References

Bird
Birding and ornithology by year